Justina (c. 340 – c. 388) was a Roman empress. She was initially the wife of the rebel emperor Magnentius and was then married to Valentinian I, with whom she had four children, including the emperor Valentinian II and the empress Galla.

Possibly a relative of the Constantinian dynasty, she was Valentinian's second wife after Marina Severa, and step-mother of the augustus Gratian and the mother-in-law of the augustus Theodosius I. Her infant son Valentinian was made emperor shortly after her husband's death in November 375. According to Late Antique ecclesiastical history, Justina was an Arian Christian, and began to promote this christology after her husband died, bringing her into conflict with Ambrose, the Nicene Christian bishop of Mediolanum (Milan). In 387, fleeing from the invasion of the Italian Peninsula by the emperor Magnus Maximus, Justina took her children to the Balkans – including the child-emperor Valentinian II – and secured the intervention of the eastern emperor Theodosius in the civil war by marrying her daughter Galla to him at Thessalonica. Afterwards, Theodosius attacked and defeated Magnus Maximus, ending the civil war, during which time Justina herself apparently died.

Family
Justina was a daughter of Justus, governor of Picenum under Constantius II. According to Socrates of Constantinople: "Justus the father of Justina, who had been governor of Picenum under the reign of Constantius, had a dream in which he seemed to himself to bring forth the imperial purple out of his right side. When this dream had been told to many persons, it at length came to the knowledge of Constantius, who conjecturing it to be a presage that a descendant of Justus would become emperor, caused him to be assassinated."

Justina had two known brothers, Constantius and Cerealis. One of her daughters was named Galla. In La Pseudobigamie de Valentinien I (1958), J. Rougé argues all three names were representative of their descent from the Neratius family, an aristocratic family connected to the Constantinian dynasty through marriage. According to the Prosopography of the Later Roman Empire the names Justus and Justina may also indicate a relation to the Vettus family.

The Prosopography mentions a theory that Justus was a son of Vettius Justus, Consul in 328, and a woman of the Neratius family. The latter family produced several relatively notable members in the early 4th century. The first was Galla, wife of Julius Constantius and mother of Constantius Gallus. Her brothers were Neratius Cerealis, Consul in 358 and Vulcacius Rufinus, Praetorian prefect of Italy from 365 to his death in 368.

Although Timothy Barnes has theorised that Justina was a granddaughter or great-granddaughter of Crispus through her unnamed mother (Crispus was the only son of Constantine I and Minervina), it seems more probable that she was in fact the granddaughter of Julius Constantius, son of Constantius Chlorus and half-brother of Constantine the Great. Justina's mother was probably a daughter of Julius Constantius and his first wife, the aforementioned Galla. Hence, this makes Justina at the heart of the family connexions between the Constantinian and the Valentinianic (and later Theodosian) dynasties.

Marriage to Magnentius
Justina was first married to Magnentius, a Roman usurper, from 350 to 353. However both Zosimus and the fragmentary chronicle of John of Antioch, a 7th-century monk tentatively identified with John of the Sedre, Syrian Orthodox Patriarch of Antioch from 641 to 648, report that Justina was too young at the time of her first marriage to have children.

Empress and marriage to Valentinian I
In c. 370, Justina became the second wife of Valentinian I. According to Socrates of Constantinople: "Justina being thus bereft of her father, still continued a virgin. Some time after she became known to Severa, wife of the emperor Valentinian, and had frequent dialogue with the empress, until their intimacy at length grew to such an extent that they were accustomed to bathe together. When Severa saw Justina in the bath she was greatly struck with the beauty of the virgin, and spoke of her to the emperor; saying that the daughter of Justus was so lovely a creature, and possessed of such symmetry of form, that she herself, though a woman, was altogether charmed with her. The emperor, treasuring this description by his wife in his own mind, considered with himself how he could espouse Justina, without repudiating Severa, as she had borne him Gratian, whom he had created Augustus a little while before. He accordingly framed a law, and caused it to be published throughout all the cities, by which any man was permitted to have two lawful wives."

John Malalas, the Chronicon Paschale and John of Nikiû report Severa to have been banished because of involvement in an illegal transaction. Barnes considers this story to be an attempt to justify the divorce of Valentinian I without blaming the emperor. Socrates' story was dismissed by later historians whose interpretation of it was an unlikely legalization of bigamy. However Barnes and others consider this decision to only allow various Romans to divorce and then remarry. The controversy being that Christianity had yet to accept the concept of a divorce. Barnes considers that Valentinian was willing to go forth with the legal reformation in pursuit of dynastic legitimacy that would secure his presence on the throne.

Justina became the stepmother of Gratian. Justina and Valentinian I had four known children. Their only son was Valentinian II. Their daughters were Galla, Grata and Justa. According to Socrates, Grata and Justa remained unmarried. They were probably still alive in 392 but not mentioned afterwards. Valentinian I died in 375.

Widowhood and the reign of Valentinian II
According to Ammianus Marcellinus, Zosimus and Philostorgius, Justina was living near Sirmium by the time she was widowed. During the reign of Valentinian II, she moved with him to Mediolanum (Milan). She assisted her young son Valentinian II's rule.

In 383, Gratian had died while facing a major revolt under Magnus Maximus. Maximus proceeded to establish his control of a portion of the Roman Empire including Britain, Gaul, Hispania and the Diocese of Africa. He ruled from his capital at Augusta Treverorum (Treves, Trier) and was able to negotiate his recognition by Valentinian II and Theodosius I, starting from 384. The area of Valentinian II had effectively been limited to Italia, ruling from Mediolanum (modern Milan).

Justina was an Arian though unable to act in favor of her religious faction until after the death of her husband. She maintained a long struggle against Ambrose, leader of the Nicene faction in Milan. The dispute started in 385 when Ambrose refused the imperial court's demand for the Arian usage of a basilica for Easter, a cause which Justina championed. Many church historians influenced by Ambrose's rhetoric wrote negative accounts about her, stating that she persecuted the bishop for selfish reasons. However, Justina was not the only person in the court pursuing the Arian worship, since Gothic soldiers and some high-ranking civilian and military officials under Valentinian also had a stake in it.

In 387, the truce between Valentinian II and Maximus ended. The latter crossed the Alps into the Po Valley and threatened Milan. Justina and her children Valentinian and Galla fled their capital for Thessaloniki, capital of the Praetorian prefecture of Illyricum and at the time chosen residence of Theodosius. Theodosius was at the time a widower, his first wife Aelia Flaccilla having died in 385 or 386.

Theodosius granted refuge to the fugitives. According to the account of Zosimus, Justina arranged for Galla to appear in tears before Theodosius and appeal to his compassion. Galla was reportedly a beautiful woman and Theodosius was soon smitten with her, requesting to marry her. Justina used this to her advantage, setting a condition for the marriage agreement to be sealed. Under her condition, Theodosius would have to attack Maximus and restore Valentinian II to his throne. Theodosius consented to Justina's request, the marriage probably taking place in late 387.

The account was questioned by Louis-Sébastien Le Nain de Tillemont as inconsistent with the piety of Theodosius. Tillemont suggested that the marriage took place in 386, prior to the beginning of hostilities. The History of the Decline and Fall of the Roman Empire by Edward Gibbon considered Zosimus' account more likely and later works, including the Dictionary of Greek and Roman Biography and Mythology, have followed his example. Now, modern scholars largely believe that Theodosius married Galla with a political intent because an alliance joining the Theodosian and Valentinianic dynasties would have been forged, allowing Theodosius to further control his Western counterpart.

In July–August, 388, the combined troops of Theodosius I and Valentinian II invaded the territory of Maximus under the leadership of Richomeres, Arbogast, Promotus and Timasius.  Maximus suffered a series of losses and surrendered in Aquileia. He was executed on 28 August 388. His son and nominal co-ruler Flavius Victor was also executed. His wife Helen and two daughters were spared. The condition for Galla's marriage had been met. Theodosius sent Valentinian to the West, and though Justina was believed by Zosimus to have intended to go with him, she died the same year, uncertain if she was able to witness the result of her efforts.

References

Sources
 
Camphausen, Hans v., 1929. Ambrosius von Mailand als Kirchenpolitiker. Berlin/Leipzig.
Homes Dudden, A., 1935. The Life and Times of St. Ambrose. Oxford.
Jones, A. H. M. et al., 1971. The Prosopographie of the Later Roman Empire I.. Cambridge.
Meslin, Michael, 1967. Les ariens d'occident, pp 335–430. Paris.

External links

Section about her in "Ammianus Marcellinus and the Representation of Historical Reality" by Timothy David Barnes
Section about her on "Failure of Empire" by Noel Emmanuel Lenski
Profile of Vulcacius Rufinus in the Prosopography of the Later Roman Empire

4th-century births
388 deaths
4th-century Roman empresses
Arian Christians
Constantinian dynasty
Romans from unknown gentes
Valentinianic dynasty
4th-century women rulers